Nikos Kokolodimitrakis (born 7 April 1981) is a Greek retired handball player. He competed in the men's tournament at the 2004 Summer Olympics.

References

External links
 

1981 births
Living people
Greek male handball players
Olympic handball players of Greece
Handball players at the 2004 Summer Olympics
Sportspeople from Chania